The defence of Greenland is the responsibility of the Kingdom of Denmark. The government of Greenland does not have control of Greenland's military or foreign affairs. The most important part of Greenland's defensive territory remains the 12 maritime zones. In recent years there has been a significant increase in the presence of new challenges. In the history of Greenland there have been many changes of presence regarding who is in charge of the security of Greenlandic people and its land.

History
Danish military history on Greenland has its origins in the early 18th century. In 1721 Hans Egede, a Danish-Norwegian missionary first colonised the region. Soldiers were stationed on Greenland to protect the Danish colony from looting, especially against foreign whalers. Denmark and Norway split a century later in 1814, leaving Greenland under complete Danish rule.

In 1932, the Navy Flyvevæsen (Naval Air Force) made its first appearance. The Air Force contributed aerial photography to the Geodætisk Institute, a cartographic institute under the Ministry of Defence. All military work was carried out during the summer months, from May to September, after which the ships were transferred to Iceland or Denmark during the winter months.

The Danish Navy was actively involved in exploring Greenland through expeditions until the beginning of the Second World War. The armed forces were also responsible for surveying and cartography. Greenland took its first step towards independence in 1953 when representation in the Danish Parliament was gained. "The Folketing shall consist of one assembly of not more than one hundred and seventy-nine Members of whom two Members shall be elected in the Faroe Islands and two Members in Greenland."

Second World War 

Due to the German occupation of Denmark (operation Weserübung), on 9 April 1940, Denmark was prompted to sign an agreement with the United States in order to maintain control of the Greenlandic territory in allied hands. The Thulesag 1 agreement, signed on 9 April 1941, gave the US military authority over the defence of Greenland. The US-built airfields, harbors, anti-aircraft fortifications, radio, and meteorological sites. The allies feared that Nazi Germany could use Greenland as a base of operations to conduct offensive attacks on Washington, D.C. via bombing and submarine attacks. The United States' entry into the war meant that Greenland would become much more valuable to the allied war efforts as airfields and harbors in Greenland were used for important transatlantic links. As per the Thulesag 1 agreement, these facilities fell entirely under US jurisdiction while at the same time Danish sovereignty over Greenland was maintained.

Article 10 of the agreement contained a repeal clause. The treaty was to remain in force until "existing threats to the peace and security of the American continent no longer exist". This prompted the United States to build a number of military bases during the Second World War, including Thule Air Base, airfields, and a military hospital. The agreement was finally ratified by the Danish Parliament (Today's Folketing) after the end of the war on 16 May 1945. By the end of World War II, the U.S. had built or expanded 17 facilities, including air bases such as Narsarsuaq and Kangerlussuaq.

As a countermeasure against the Germans, a permanent patrol service with sledge dogs was established with the Sirius Patrol, which still exists today. The first offensive against the Germans took place on 13 May 1943, when the German weather patrol was discovered by members of the Sledge Patrol. Eli Knudsen, a Danish corporal, was killed during the battle. A second battle took place on 22 April 1944. The Sledge Patrol of Greenland was defunct after the end of the war. In 1953, a new dog unit was named as Sirius Patrol, after the star constellation Canis Major. It contains Sirius, also well known as the brightest star in the night sky, called "dog-star". Prince Frederik of Denmark took part in a Sirius expedition from 11 February to 31 May 2000, which gave the unit a new value in the story of Greenland.

Postwar Period
Following the Second World War, the sovereignty and defence of Greenland once again returned to Denmark. The United States continued to be interested in a permanent military presence due to the increasing tensions of the Cold War; however, Greenland was expected to remain under sole Danish control by the public. A US proposal to buy Greenland was rejected by the Danish government, with regard to the Soviet Union.

Cold War
Since overseas territories, such as Greenland, could hardly be protected by a Scandinavian Defence Alliance, Denmark's integration into NATO was likely to happen. In 1949, new opportunities for both countries opened up as the Danish membership into the military alliance was in place. The USA hoped to solve the question of a navy presence through multilateral negotiations. However, Denmark saw itself in a position to circumvent agreements with the American superpower, which was based solely on bilateral negotiations, and to guarantee Greenland's sovereignty for the future. On 27 April 1951, Thulesag 2 was signed. This meant that the United States would assist Denmark in necessary defence of Greenland within the framework of the North Atlantic Treaty. For this purpose, more American military bases were to be established. Article 5, paragraph 3, guaranteed the US and its troops unrestricted freedom of operation between these bases, on land, air, and sea, throughout the entire national territory. Article 6 obliged the US "to show due respect for all regulations and customs affecting the population and the administration of Greenland". The military airbase in Narsarsuaq was developed into a joint base of Danish and American troops.

At the end of 1953, the secret of a weather station 140 km from the army base in Kangerlussuaq came to light. The station had been built by US forces without the knowledge of the Danish government.

Nevertheless, on 15 March 1954, the expansion of Thule Air Base was set into motion. This included the installation of a new generation air defense system that was equipped with nuclear weapons. The expansion also involved the forced resettlement of local Inuit inhabitants.

Changes from 2008 / 2009
A referendum on the law on self-government was held in Greenland on 25 November 2008. A large majority of 75.5% voted in favour of extended self-government. The law is to be seen as a step towards independence from Denmark. On 21 June 2009, an extended agreement on autonomy came into force. Only foreign and defence policy remained in Danish responsibility. The Greenlandic government took over responsibilities for the police, justice, and coastal protection. Those that affect Navy provision include:
 Greenland's government will be given significant autonomy in determining foreign affairs.
 Many aspects of foreign affairs policy will no longer be linked to Danish policy.
 Control of the militarised Greenlandic Coast Guard will be transferred to the Government of Greenland.
 The Greenlandic government will take control of policing, including the police motor launches currently trained to assist the military in the Island Command Greenland.

Today's challenges 
There are many new challenges that Greenland has to face today. New sea routes lead past Greenland that require special protection. Ice cap melting may increase the availability of raw materials that must be protected. The likelihood of military conflict in Greenland is unlikely; however, a relevant defence in the Arctic region is at the core of Danish defence priorities.  The country's naval presence and activities are based on close relationships with the local populations and authorities of both Greenland and the Faroe Islands. It is in no doubt important to the Danish armed forces' future presence in the Arctic to continue to strengthen and develop this relationship. The consequences of climate change will likely not only bring better maritime accessibility but also an increased interest in the extraction of natural resources, as well as intensified scientific and commercial activity. There is also a significant increase in military activity in the region. Accordingly, the geopolitical importance of the Arctic will become increasingly significant in the years to come.

Military efforts in the Arctic are strengthened by: 
 The Arctic Agreement of December 2016, which augments surveillance, command, control, communication, and operational efforts in the Arctic Region, is continued. New operational initiatives can be re-prioritised within the framework of the Agreement. An annually allocated sum of 120 million DKK for initiatives, with a total sum of 720 million DKK after six years. Furthermore, a total of 235 million DKK will be allocated through the Defence Agreement to the following additional initiatives. 
 Equipment to prevent pollution in the waters around Greenland. 
 An increased focus on different education methods. The important issues are now civil preparedness and contingency education, as well as other projects such as the Greenland Guard.
 Initial conscription enrolment assessments to be carried out in Greenland for volunteers who want to sign up for national service. 
 Subsidised travel schemes for Greenlandic conscripts to travel home.
 More apprentice positions for secondary school students to be established in connection to Armed Forces units. 
 A contribution to the mapping of the ice chart north of 62°N and to the new land mapping of Greenland.
 The Ministry of Defence will finance the operational costs of the radio room at the maritime emergency radio in Greenland.

New military vessels solve environmental protection and pollution control tasks. The Parties note that the tender for new pollution control ships will be reconsidered in order to further examine a solution where new military vessels, in addition to their operational military tasks, when necessary, can also solve environmental protection and pollution control tasks. Denmark does not have a specific coast guard entity, as the Royal Danish Navy (Søværnet) is responsible for providing the services that would normally fall to a coast guard. The Navy is thus used by various agencies to carry out search and rescue, navigation assistance, environmental protection, and fisheries inspections, in addition to sovereignty and maritime surveillance. Today, the Danish Navy is divided into the First and Second Squadrons. While the Second Squadron is focused on foreign operations, the first squadron has responsibility for internal affairs, which includes the northern Atlantic (Greenland) and the North Sea (Faroe Islands). Responsibility for coast guard tasks, therefore, falls under the first squadron headquarters in Frederikshavn, as well as the newly established Arctic Command in Nuuk, Greenland (Danish Ministry of Defence 2011). The Arctic Command is responsible for overseeing all maritime activity in the waters around Greenland and the Faroe Islands so that the Danish Navy and the local authorities are in close coordination in crisis situations in the High North.

See also 

 Joint Arctic Command
 Sirius Arctic Patrol
 Military of Denmark

References

Literature used for additional Information 

 Archer, Clive. "Greenland, US bases and missile defence: new two-level negotiations?
 NASA, T. Greicius; "Greenland's Rapid Melt Will Mean More Flooding"; (2019)
 O'connor Tom, Newsweek; "Russia says Donald Trump has the right to try to buy Greenland" (2019)
 Policy and Politics. Palgrave Macmillan, Cham, 2020. 439-452
 Pompeo, Michael R. "Looking North: Sharpening America's Arctic Focus." US Department of State 6 (2019)
 Rahbek-Clemmensen, Jon. "The Arctic turn: How did the High North become a foreign and security policy priority for Denmark?" Greenland and the International Politics of a Changing
 Rottem Svein Vigeland. "The Arctic Council: Between environmental protection and geopolitics." The Arctic Council. Palgrave Pivot, Singapore, 2020. 91-95
 Slim Allagui, PHYSORG, "Greenland becomes new promised land for oil firms"; (2011)
 Sørensen, Camilla Tenna Nørup, and Mikkel Runge Olesen. "Stormagtsspillet i Arktis udfordrer småstaterne. Erfaringer fra Finland, Norge og Island." (2019)
 The Guardian. "Independent Greenland 'could not afford' to sign up to Paris climate deal" (2016)
 Vidal, John. "Time to listen to the ice scientists about the arctic death spiral." The Guardian 18 (2016)
 Wang Nils, and Damien Degeorges. "Greenland and the New Arctic: Political and security implications of a statebuilding project." (2014)
 Wiseman, Matthew S. "The Future of the Arctic Council." The Palgrave Handbook of Arctic

 
Military of Denmark